The Japanese School in Seoul (ソウル日本人学校, Souru Nihonjin Gakkō, 서울일본인학교) is a Japanese international school located in the Sangam-dong neighborhood of Mapo District, Seoul, for the children of Japanese citizens residing in South Korea.

The Japanese School in Seoul was established on May 8, 1972, with a total of 33 kindergarten and primary school students. In 2005, it had grown to 403 students at kindergarten, primary and middle school levels. The Japanese School in Seoul is recognized by Japan's Ministry of Education as teaching a curriculum equivalent to schools for the same ages in Japan.

The Japanese School in Seoul moved to its current location in Digital Media City (DMC) in Mapo on September 27, 2010, from its former location in the Gaepo-dong neighborhood of Gangnam District.

See also

Education in Japan
ソウル日本人学校園児襲撃事件/서울 일본인 학교 습격 사건 (Japanese School in Seoul kindergarten attack incident)

South Korean schools in Japan:
 Tokyo Korean School
 Educational Foundation Kyoto International School
 Baekdu Hagwon
 Korea International School

References

External links
 Japanese School in Seoul 
 Japanese School in Seoul (in Japanese) (Archive)

Educational institutions established in 1972
Seoul
International schools in Seoul
Seoul
Mapo District